Parkers Creek is a  long 2nd order tributary to the New Hope River in North Carolina.  Parkers Creek joins the New Hope River within the B. Everett Jordan Lake Reservoir.

Course
Parkers Creek rises on the Haw River divide about 0.2 miles southeast of Red Hill.  Parkers Creek then flows southeast and south to meet New Hope River in the B. Everett Jordan Lake Reservoir in Chatham County.

Watershed
Parkers Creek drains  of area, receives about 47.2 in/year of precipitation, has a topographic wetness index of 516.42, and has an average water temperature of 15.21 °C.  The watershed is 71% forested.

Additional images

References

Rivers of North Carolina
Rivers of Chatham County, North Carolina